George Francis "Duke" Harris (February 25, 1942 – August 2, 2017) was a Canadian professional ice hockey right winger who played 26 games in the National Hockey League during the 1967–68 season with the Minnesota North Stars and Toronto Maple Leafs. He also played in the WHA from 1972 to 1975 with the Chicago Cougars and Houston Aeros. He died in 2017, six months after heart surgery.

Early life
Harris grew up in Point Edward, Ontario. He played 5 seasons with the St. Catharines Teepees, starting his first season in 1958 at the age of 16. In the 1960 season with the Teepees Harris helped the team win the [Memorial Cup]] against the Edmonton Oil Kings. In the 1961–62 season he played with the Guelph Royals

Professional career
In 1961–62 Harris played his first professional games, appearing in 7 games with the Sault Thunderbirds of the Eastern Professional Hockey League (EPHL). in 1962–63 he scored 28 goals as a EPHL's St. Louis Braves.

NHL career
Harris played 26 NHL games in 1967–68, 22 with the Minnesota North Stars. He was traded to the Toronto Maple Leafs during the season, where he played 4 more games. The rest of the season was spent in the minor leagues.

Post-NHL career
After the NHL Harris played two seasons with the Vancouver Canucks of the Western Hockey League. In the 1968–69 season Harris scored 23 goals and had 17 assists for a total of 40 points. He also played 3 non-consecutive seasons with the Rochester Americans in the [[American Hockey League, 1967–68, 1970–71, and 1971–72.

World Hockey Association
In 1972 Harris joined the Houston Aeros of the newly founded World Hockey Association (WHA). He scored 30 goals for Houston during the 1972–73 season. He then played two seasons with the Chicago Cougars before retiring in 1975.

Personal life 
Harris was married for 55 years, until his death, to Eleanor Marie Harris. They had two children, Kimberly Marie Harris and Robert Harris.

After retiring from professional hockey Harris worked as a crane operator in Sarnia, Ontario.

Career statistics

Regular season and playoffs

References

External links
 

1942 births
2017 deaths
Canadian ice hockey right wingers
Chicago Cougars players
Fort Worth Wings players
Guelph Royals players
Houston Aeros (WHA) players
Ice hockey people from Ontario
Minnesota North Stars players
Pittsburgh Hornets players
Rochester Americans players
Sault Thunderbirds players
Sportspeople from Sarnia
St. Louis Braves players
St. Louis Braves (EPHL) players
Toronto Maple Leafs players
Vancouver Canucks (WHL) players